The following lists events that happened during 2013 in the Republic of Serbia.

Incumbents 
 President: Tomislav Nikolić
 Prime Minister: Ivica Dačić

Events

April
 April 9 - At least 13 people are killed and another three are injured after a man goes on a spree shooting in the village of Velika Ivanča.

October  
 Jovanka Broz, the widow of Josip Broz Tito (lifelong president of Yugoslavia) died in Belgrade.

References

 
Years of the 21st century in Serbia
2010s in Serbia
Serbia
Serbia